John Livesey (8 March 1924 – 1988) was an English footballer who played as a forward.

Born in Preston, Livesey started his professional career in his hometown with Preston North End, but failed to make a first team appearance. He went on to play for Bury and Doncaster Rovers before signing for Rochdale in 1948, where he scored 36 goals in 113 League games. After a brief spell with Mossley, he returned to The Football League with Southport for one season. He then dropped into non-league football again to play for Wigan Athletic and Nelson.

References

External links
 Career statistics

1924 births
1988 deaths
Footballers from Preston, Lancashire
English footballers
Association football forwards
Bury F.C. players
English Football League players
Doncaster Rovers F.C. players
Rochdale A.F.C. players
Mossley A.F.C. players
Southport F.C. players
Wigan Athletic F.C. players
Nelson F.C. players
Preston North End F.C. players